Rubén Michavila Jover (born May 11, 1970 in Barcelona, Catalonia) is a former water polo player from Spain, who was a member of the national team that won the silver medal near his home town, at the 1992 Summer Olympics in Barcelona, Spain.

See also
 List of Olympic medalists in water polo (men)
 List of world champions in men's water polo
 List of World Aquatics Championships medalists in water polo

References
 Spanish Olympic Committee

External links
 

1970 births
Living people
Spanish male water polo players
Olympic water polo players of Spain
Water polo players at the 1992 Summer Olympics
Olympic silver medalists for Spain
Water polo players from Barcelona
Olympic medalists in water polo
World Aquatics Championships medalists in water polo
Medalists at the 1992 Summer Olympics
20th-century Spanish people
Sportsmen from Catalonia